Haki, Hake or Haco, the brother of Hagbard, was a famous Scandinavian sea-king, in Norse mythology. He is mentioned in the 12th century  Gesta Danorum, and in 13th-century sources including Ynglinga saga, Nafnaþulur, and the Völsunga saga. If historical, he would have lived in the 5th century.

Ynglinga saga
Snorri Sturluson wrote in the Ynglinga saga that Haki had amassed a great force of warriors and sometimes plundered together with his brother Hagbard (who himself was the hero of one of the most popular legends of ancient Scandinavia, see Hagbard and Signy). When Haki considered that he had amassed enough wealth and followers to make himself the king of Sweden, he proceeded with his army against the Swedish royal seat at Uppsala. Haki was a brutal warrior and he had twelve champions, among whom was the legendary warrior Starkad the Old.

The Swedish king Hugleik had also gathered a large army and was supported by the two champions Svipdag and Geigad.

On the Fyrisvellir (Fyris Wolds), south of Uppsala, there was a great battle in which the Swedish army was defeated. Haki and his men captured the Swedish champions Svipdag and Geigad and then they attacked the 'shield-circle' around the Swedish king and slew him and his two sons.

Haki and his warriors subdued the Swedish provinces and Haki made himself the king of Sweden. Then he happily sat in peace for three years while his warriors travelled far and wide and amassed fortunes.

The previous king, Hugleik, had two cousins named Eric and Jorund, who had become famous by killing Gudlög, the king of Hålogaland. When they learnt that king Haki's champions were gone plundering, they assembled a large force and steered towards Sweden. They were joined by many Swedes who wanted to reinstall the Yngling dynasty on the Swedish throne.

The two brothers entered Mälaren, went towards Uppsala, and landed on the Fyrisvellir. There they were met by king Haki, who had a considerably smaller force. Haki was, however, a brutal enemy who killed many men and lastly Eric, who held the banner of the two brothers. Jorund and his men fled to the ships, but Haki was mortally wounded.

Haki asked for a longship, which was loaded with his dead warriors and their weapons. He had the sails hoisted and set fire to a piece of tar-wood, which he asked to be covered with a pile of wood. Haki was all but dead when he was laid on top of the pile. The wind was blowing towards the water and the ship departed in full flame between the small islands out into the sea. This was much talked about and it gave him great fame.

Other traditions
Most legends surrounding Haki are probably lost. In the Völsunga saga, Gudrun and Brynhild have a discussion on the "greatest of men" referring to a legend now lost, where Haki's sons have not yet avenged their sisters by killing the evil Sigar (the feud with Sigar is still going on and Hagbard has not yet been hanged):

In Gesta Danorum (book 7), Haki (Hakon) killed Sigar, avenging his brother Hagbard's death. In Gesta Danorum, Saxo Grammaticus gives Haki as a king of Denmark, and Hugleik, called Huglet(h)us, is an Irish king. The motivation behind the attack was to show that even the furthest kingdoms of the world might not be untouched by the Danish arms.

Saxo writes that Starkad and Haki brought their fleet to Ireland, where the rich and greedy king Hugleik lived. Hugleik was never generous to an honourable man, but spent all his riches on mimes and jugglers. In spite of his avarice, Hugleik had the great champions Geigad and Svipdag. When the battle began, the jugglers and mimes panicked and fled, and only Geigad and Svipdag remained to defend Hugleik, but they fought like an entire army. Geigad dealt Starkad a wound on the head which was so severe that Starkad would later sing songs about it. Starkad killed Hugleik and made the Irish flee. He then had the jugglers and mimes whipped and beaten, in order to humiliate them. Then the Danes brought Hugleik's riches out to Dublin to be publicly looted, and there was so much of it that none cared for its strict division. When Haki learnt that his brother Hagbard had been killed by Sigar, he avenged his brother. However, killing Sigar was not enough to satiate his thirst for blood:

He was soon chased away by Sigar's son Siwald.

Secondary sources
Nerman, B. Det svenska rikets uppkomst. Stockholm, 1925.

Notes

Heroes in Norse myths and legends
Mythological kings of Sweden